Jack Scott is an Australian actor. He has a strong comedy background having performed in numerous improvisation shows and has come most recently to prominence in the 2021 remake of the television program RFDS (TV series).

Education
Scott was born and raised in Sydney, New South Wales.

He attended Newington College completing the Higher School Certificate in 2012. At Newington Scott played Mark Antony in the middle school production of Julius Caesar in 2010. That year he also had minor roles in the musical, Seussical. He had a minor role in the production of Bertold Brecht’s Life of Galileo, in 2011. The following year he played Nick Bottom in the senior production, The Popular Mechanicals. He was also part of the Theatresports group in 2011 and 2012.

After high School he performed in numerous improvisation shows with his comedy troupe, The Bear Pack, including at the 2013 Sydney Comedy Festival and the University of New South Wales Arts Revue. Scott studied at Western Australian Academy of Performing Arts at Edith Cowan University, graduating in 2017. Whilst at WAAPA, he performed the roles of Mr Van Daan in The Diary Of Anne Frank and Tiger Brown in Threepenny Opera. At the time he starred in the Western Australian Screen Academy film Dark Horses for which he was awarded the Best Actor Award at the Next Gen Film Festival and the Western Australian Unlocked Film Festival.

Career
Scott has appeared in:
 ABC TV (Australian TV channel) series Back In Very Small Business, Rosehaven, Tonightly with Tom Ballard and Frayed
 Emmy Kids Award-winning children's TV series Hardball
 Feature film Hearts and Bones
 Allegations
 AFTRS Webseries Nanny Academy
 We Are Gods for National Institute of Dramatic Art
 Necrophillia for JackRabbit Theatre
 Cool Pool Party and Hamlet for Bell Shakespeare
 Improvisation theatre at the Sydney Comedy Festival, Sydney Fringe Comedy Festival and the Melbourne International Comedy Festival
 Peacock series Joe vs. Carole as Joshua Dial.

References

Living people
People educated at Newington College
Western Australian Academy of Performing Arts alumni
Australian actors
Year of birth missing (living people)